Elaphandra is a genus of flowering plants in the family Asteraceae.

 species
The genus is primarily native to South America, with one species extending into Trinidad and Tobago and another into Panamá.

References

 
Asteraceae genera
Taxonomy articles created by Polbot